Kitab-Verlag is a publishing house in Klagenfurt, Austria. It primarily publishes works on the history of the culture of the near east and modern literature from Austria, Slovenia, and Italy. "Kitab" is the Arabic word for "book" and "Verlag" is German for "publishing house".

Ethos 
The Kitab-Verlag was founded in 1999 by Wilhelm Baum and Robert Gutounig to promote cross-cultural understanding and bring the work of smaller intellectual groups to a wider readership. The publishing house thus releases works from authors who try to transcend national, cultural and religious boundaries. The series "Tangenten" was established to promote such crossing of cultures and nations. In addition, the publisher's stated objective is the promotion of cultural and literary texts from other world cultures, such as those of Asian, African or Latin American origin. Kitab-Verlag has established contact with non-German publishers, especially in East Asia, and publishes texts in other languages.

References

External links 
 Official site

Book publishing companies of Austria
Economy of Carinthia (state)
Klagenfurt